Meyer is an unincorporated community in Adams County, Illinois, United States. It has a population of approximately 10 full-time residents as of mid-2009, due to the flood of 2008. The community is part of the Quincy, IL–MO Micropolitan Statistical Area. It is the westernmost community in Illinois.

Meyer sits in a fertile flood plain along the east bank of the Mississippi River in northwestern Adams County. The river plays a significant role in the area's local economy. A large grain elevator lies to the south of the community.

Less than a mile from Meyer is the Canton, Missouri ferry landing that connects the community with the state of Missouri. The ferry ceased operation in the spring of 2014.

Meyer has been affected by floods throughout its history, the most notable occurring in 1944 and 1993. The community was again affected during an extensive flood event in June 2008.

On June 18, the Meyer levee was compromised, although most of the residents had left following a voluntary order earlier in the week.

References

Unincorporated communities in Adams County, Illinois
Quincy, Illinois micropolitan area
Unincorporated communities in Illinois
Illinois populated places on the Mississippi River